The Tale of Four, is a 2017 United States short film directed by Gabourey Sidibe as her directorial debut and co-produced by Kia Perry, Lisa Cortes and Shannon Gibson. The shot revolves among four different women with four different paths where ironically all their lives interconnected. It is based on the song "Four Women" sung by singer and political activist Nina Simone.

The film stars Ledisi Young, Meagan Kimberly Smith, Dana Gourrier and Aisha Hinds in lead roles. The film received positive reviews and won several awards at international film festivals. The film had its premier in September 2016 in New York City, New York and then screened on 25 June 2017 at Nantucket Film Festival. It won the award for the Best Short at the 2017 Urbanworld Film Festival.

Cast
 Ledisi Young as Aunt Sara
 Meagan Kimberly Smith as Saffronia
 Dana Gourrier as Sweet Thing
 Aisha Hinds as Peaches
 Brett Gray as Greg
 Jacob Berger as Officer Shields
 Daniel G. Cunningham as Jason
 Ta'Rhonda Jones as Sister
 Okema Moore as Jesse
 Jussie Smollett		
 Phyllis Yvonne Stickney		
 Victoria Wallace as Quincy

References

External links
 
 The Tale of Four on YouTube

2017 short films
American short films